Vehicle license plates in the Philippines are issued and regulated by the Land Transportation Office (LTO), a government agency under the Department of Transportation (DOTr).

History
In January 2013, the Land Transportation Office began a license plate standardization project by issuing plates with modern security features, including holograms and bar codes. They also planned to slowly phase out the old 1981 plate format. In the new format, the LTO will issue LLL-DDDD plates (where L represents a letter and D represents a one-digit number) for four-wheel vehicles and DDD-LLL/L-DDD-LL plates for motorcycles.

The new plate format series and design was originally scheduled for release on September or October 2013. However, it was delayed several times primarily due to concerns about the release of funds for the license plate project, as well as the increase in purchases of new cars using temporary license plates bearing the conduction sticker number. Eventually, in May 2014, the first batch of new license plates was released. By January 2015, vehicle owners were required to pay PHP 450 to change their old plates into a modern series plate.

In 2016, the LTO issued "virtual plates" as a temporary measure to address the backlog in physical license plates. New vehicles were issued a virtual identification consisting of a combination of alphanumeric symbols, which will make it easier for the LTO to release the permanent license plates once they were available.In August 2017, the Department of Transportation selected the winning bidder under the government's "Moving Forward Program" to reduce the backlog of 3.4 million plates spanning from July 2016 to December 2017. 

In January 2018, the Supreme Court ordered the release of license plates held due to restraining orders saddling the plate modernization program. It was expected that the distribution of new plates would commence at full swing by mid-February 2018. The machines were delivered to the LTO in February 2018 and were installed in a new plate making facility. The new license plates were released in July 2018 throughout the country. Under this new plate series, the first letter of the license plate will determine where the vehicle is registered. This is the same designation that was implemented during the 1981 series.

Current plate design specifications

Plate Number Dimension and Font Style 
The current version of the license plates measure 390 mm wide and 140 mm high, while current motorcycle plates measure 235 mm wide and 135 mm high. The characters are stamped on an aluminum plate, which is then painted with reflective paint. FE-Schrift was chosen as the font to be used on license plates in 2018 because the style of the font makes it difficult to modify the letters.

Registration Area Prefixes 
After the release of the new plate number design in 2018, all virtual and temporary plates that were issued from July 2016 to December 2017 using the 2014 design were updated to 2018's alphabetical designation. The first letter in the 2018 automobile plate number design represents the prefix, which denotes the region where the vehicle was registered. The letter S is used to indicate a government-owned vehicle.

Vehicle Classification by Second Letter 
The second letter on the number plate classifies whether the vehicle is a wheeled trailer or an automobile. Letter U in the second letter represents a Private Used Trailer, while Z represents a Public Used Trailer. Trailers registered from 2016 onwards currently use 6-Numbered temporary plates as trailer plates are not yet in production. 

On the motorcycle license plates, U and Z represent private use for three-wheeled motorcycles, while V, W, X and Y represent public use in all types of motorcycles.

Vehicle Classification by Color Scheme

Motorcycle Classification by Color Strip and its position
Motorcycle registration plates released in 2020 are color-coded to indicate the region where they are registered.

Special plate number designs

High-ranking government plates 
These plates are reserved for top government officials of the Republic of the Philippines, and have the same paint scheme as private vehicles.
 1 – President
 2 – Vice President
 3 – President of the Senate
 4 – Speaker of the House of Representatives
 5 – Chief Justice of the Supreme Court
 6 – Cabinet Secretaries
 7 – Senators
 8 – Representatives (Congressmen)
 9 – Associate Justices of the Supreme Court
 10 – Presiding Justice and other Justices of the Court of Appeals.
 11 – Chairman, Commission on Elections
 12 – Cabinet Undersecretary
 13 – Solicitor-General
 14 – Chief of Staff of the Armed Forces of the Philippines and Chief of the Philippine National Police
 16 – Regional Trial Court Judges (e.g. 16*NCR)
 17 – First Level Courts (Metropolitan Trial Court, Municipal Trial Court, Municipal Trial Court in Cities, and Shari'ah Circuit courts), added by Memorandum Order No. 297 signed by President Gloria Macapagal-Arroyo on March 2, 2009, for assistant city prosecutors, district prosecutors and chief city prosecutors. Stamped with initials of 17*ACP (court branch number).

Personalized plates 
A motorist who would like to have personalized plates can choose any letter combination upon three conditions:
 It is unique i.e., the plate does not have a registered duplicate anywhere else in the Philippines.
 The plate is not in the same format as those of government vehicles.
 The motorist pays a PHP 25,000 ($500+) fee.

The plate number fees for these plates are:
 P15,000 for three-letter, three-number OMVSP plate (except 000)
 P25,000 for three-letter, two-number plate (except 00)
 P35,0000 for three-letter, four-number plate (except 0000)

Temporary plate numbers

Motor Vehicle File Number 
The MV File Number for each vehicle has 15 digits, which are based on where the initial registration of the vehicle was carried out. (e.g. MV File # 1301-00000012345 registered in NCR).

LTO-Authorized 6-digit temporary plate number 
The temporary plate number was later issued by LTO, which has 6 digits based on where the initial purchase location of the vehicle was and its use as a PUV. (e.g. 130123 for NCR use). It is widely used due to extensive backlog of vehicle plate distribution from 2016 to 2019.

Public utility vehicles registered from July 1, 2016, onwards currently use private plates (white), MV File Number or the 6-digit Temporary Plate Number since yellow plates are in production.

Government vehicles registered from 2020 onwards currently use private plates (white) but in February 2022 the red plates released by LTO.

Former plate number designs still in use

1981 Series

Plate number design 
The 1981 design was the most widely used plate number design, in production from 1981 to 2014. LTO issued the numbering format LLL-DDD for automobile vehicles, and LL-DDDD and DDDD-LL for motorcycles. Color-coded year stickers appeared in 1982, based on the license plate's color scheme. Stickers for vehicle classification appeared in the same year.

Registration area prefix 
The first letter in the 1981 series of license plates represents the prefix, which denotes the following region where the vehicle was registered. The letter S is used to indicate a government-owned vehicle.

The letters I and O were not used in plates as the prefix to avoid confusion with the numbers 1 and 0. In 2009, they are displayed either in the middle or end, which is exclusively for private vehicles.

The letter Q was also used on regular plate circulation for motorcycles in public use. In 2009, it was used as a middle or last letter for NCR plates, while it was used as a last letter for Region 7 plates.

Vehicle classification by second letter 
The second letter on the number plate classifies whether the vehicle is a wheeled trailer or an automobile. It is also used to classify whether the vehicle is private or public use. Letter U in the second letter represents a privately-used trailer, while Z represents a publicly-used trailer. Letters V, W, X and Y were used to indicate public utility vehicles

Vehicle classification by paint scheme 

 Green on White: The most common type of registration plate, for privately owned vehicles. White background replaced by Jose Rizal Monument in 2003 for automobiles.
 Black on Yellow: Commercial vehicle or public utility vehicles
 Red on White: Government-owned vehicles. Color white replaced by Jose Rizal Monument in 2009 for automobiles.
 Blue on White: Vehicles in Diplomatic Use and Other Exempted Vehicles. Color white replaced by Jose Rizal Monument placed in left side in 2009 for automobiles.

Inscriptions 

 PILIPINAS ("Philippines", the most common inscription, in production 1981–1995, 2001–2003 for private and government vehicles, 2001–2014 for commercial and public utility vehicles)
 PHILIPPINES 2000 (1995–2000)
 ANGAT PINOY 2004 ("Rising Filipino 2004", in production 2000–2001)
 PILIPINAS - PERLAS NG SILANGAN ("Pearl of the Orient", in production 2002–2003)
 MATATAG NA REPUBLIKA ("Strong Republic", in production 2003 – April 12, 2014, for private, tourist and government vehicles)
 MC (used for private motorcycles, placed in top left)
 TC (used for motorcycles and tricycles in public use or for-hire, placed in top left)

See also
Unified Vehicular Volume Reduction Program, a road space rationing program used in Metro Manila and other urban areas based on the last digit of the vehicle's license plate.

References

Philippines
Transportation in the Philippines
Philippines transportation-related lists
 Registration plates